Courtney Warren Campbell (April 29, 1895 – December 22, 1971) was an American lawyer, World War I veteran, and politician who served one term as a Democratic member of the United States House of Representatives, from 1953 to 1955. He represented Florida's 1st congressional district, then based in St. Petersburg, Florida.

Background

Campbell, the son of Thomas Courtney Campbell and Ellen Minor Campbell, was born in Chillicothe, Missouri, and educated at Westminster College in Fulton, Missouri, and thereafter the University of Missouri at Columbia. During World War I, he served as a second lieutenant in the United States Army. He studied law and was admitted to the bar in 1924 in Missouri and Florida and practiced from 1924 to 1928 in Tampa. He also worked as a citrus farmer, banker, and land developer. He was married to the former Henrietta Hisgen.

Political life
Campbell served as the assistant attorney general of Florida and from 1941 to 1946 was a member of the Florida War Labor Relations Board. From 1942 to 1947, he was a member of the Florida State Road Board. In 1948, the Davis Causeway across Tampa Bay was renamed the Courtney Campbell Causeway in his honor. Campbell had spearheaded efforts to ensure repairs and beautification of the causeway.

Later career and death
After his single term in Congress, Campbell returned to his extensive business and civic interests and resided in Clearwater, Florida. He died in Dunedin, Florida, and is interred at Sylvan Abbey Memorial Park in Clearwater.

References

1895 births
1971 deaths
Citrus farmers from Florida
People from Chillicothe, Missouri
People from Clearwater, Florida
Florida lawyers
Democratic Party members of the United States House of Representatives from Florida
University of Missouri alumni
Westminster College (Missouri) alumni
United States Army personnel of World War I
United States Army officers
20th-century American lawyers
20th-century American politicians